The Globally Harmonized System of Classification and Labelling of Chemicals (GHS) is an internationally agreed-upon standard managed by the United Nations that was set up to replace the assortment of hazardous material classification and labelling schemes previously used around the world. Core elements of the GHS include standardized hazard testing criteria, universal warning pictograms, and harmonized safety data sheets which provide users of dangerous goods with a host of information. The system acts as a complement to the UN Numbered system of regulated hazardous material transport. Implementation is managed through the UN Secretariat. Although adoption has taken time, as of 2017, the system has been enacted to significant extents in most major countries of the world. This includes the European Union, which has implemented the United Nations' GHS into EU law as the CLP Regulation, and United States Occupational Safety and Health Administration standards.

History
Before the Globally Harmonized System of Classification and Labelling of Chemicals (GHS) was created and implemented, there were many different regulations on hazard classification in use in different countries, resulting in multiple standards, classifications and labels for the same hazard. Given the $1.7 trillion per year international trade in chemicals requiring hazard classification, the cost of compliance with multiple systems of classification and labeling is significant. Developing a worldwide standard accepted as an alternative to local and regional systems presented an opportunity to reduce cost and improve compliance.

The GHS development began at the 1992 Rio Conference on Environment and Development by the United Nations also called Earth Summit (1992) when the International Labour Organization (ILO), the Organisation for Economic Co-operation and Development (OECD), various governments and other stakeholders agreed that "A globally harmonized hazard classification and compatible labelling system, including material safety data sheets and easily understandable symbols, should be available if feasible, by the year 2000".

The universal standard for all countries was to replace all the diverse classification systems; however, it is not a compulsory provision of any treaty. The GHS provides a common infrastructure for participating countries to use when implementing a hazard classification and Hazard Communication Standard.

Hazard classification
The GHS classification system is a complex system with data obtained from tests, literature, and practical experience. The hazards of a substanse is defined in classes of hazards and categories of severity. 

The main elements of the hazard classification criteria are summarized below:

Physical hazards
Substances or articles are assigned to 8 different hazard classes largely based on the United Nations Dangerous Goods System. Additions and changes have been necessary since the scope of the GHS includes all target audiences.
 Explosives, which are assigned to one of six subcategories depending on the type of hazard they present, as used in the UN Dangerous Goods System.
 Gases are category 1 flammable if they start to flame in a range in air at 20 °C (68 °F) and a standard pressure of 101.3 kPa. Category 2 is Non flammable and non toxic gases, and category 3 is toxic gases. Substances and mixtures of this hazard class are assigned to one of two hazard categories on the basis of the outcome of the test or calculation method.
 A flammable liquid is a liquid with a flash point of not more than 93 °C (199.4 °F).  Substances and mixtures of this hazard class are assigned to one of four hazard categories on the basis of the flash point and boiling point. A pyrophoric liquid is a liquid that, even in small quantities, is liable to ignite within five minutes after coming into contact with air. Substances and mixtures of this hazard class are assigned to a single hazard category on the basis of the outcome of the UN Test N.3.
 A flammable solid is one that is readily combustible or may cause or contribute to fire through friction.  Readily combustible solids are powdered, granular, or pasty substances which are dangerous if they can be easily ignited by brief contact with an ignition source, such as a burning match, and if the flame spreads rapidly. it is further divided into • flammable solids, • polymerizing substances 
 self-reactive substances, are thermally unstable solids liable to undergo a strongly exothermic thermal decomposition even without participation of oxygen (air), other than materials classified as explosive, organic peroxides or as oxidizing.
 pyrophoric substance more colloquially described as spontaneously combusting substances are those solids or liquids that even in small quantities are liable to ignite within five minutes after coming into contact with air. Substances and mixtures of this hazard class are assigned to a single hazard category on the basis of the outcome of the UN Test N.2. 
 Self-heating substances A self-heating solids or liquids, other than a pyrophoric substance, is one which, by reaction with air and without energy supply, are liable to self-heat. Substances and mixtures of this hazard class are assigned to one of two hazard categories on the basis of the outcome of the UN Test N.4. Substances which on contact with water emit flammable gases are liable to become spontaneously flammable or to give off flammable gases in dangerous quantities. Substances and mixtures of this hazard class are assigned to one of three hazard categories on the basis of the outcome of UN Test N.5, which measures gas evolution and speed of evolution. Flammable aerosols can be classified as Class 1 or Class 2 if they contain any component, which is classified as flammable.
 Oxidizing substances and organic peroxides  contain • category 1: oxidizing substances and• category 2: organic peroxides, organic liquids or solids that contain the bivalent -O-O- structure and may be considered a derivative of hydrogen peroxide, where one or both of the hydrogen atoms have been replaced by organic radicals. The term also includes organic peroxide formulations (mixtures). Substances and mixtures of this hazard class are assigned to one of seven 'Types', A to G, on the basis of the outcome of the UN Test Series A to H.
Radioactive substances 
 Substances corrosive to metal are substances or mixtures that by chemical action will materially damage or even destroy metals. These substances or mixtures are classified in a single hazard category on the basis of tests (Steel: ISO 9328 (II): 1991 - Steel type P235; Aluminum: ASTM G31-72 (1990) - non-clad types 7075-T6 or AZ5GU-T66). The GHS criteria are a corrosion rate on steel or aluminum surfaces exceeding 6.25 mm (0.246063in) per year at a test temperature of 55 °C (131°F).
Miscellaneous dangerous substances

Health hazards
 Acute toxicity includes five GHS categories from which the appropriate elements relevant to transport, consumer, worker and environment protection can be selected. Substances are assigned to one of the five toxicity categories on the basis of LD50 (oral, dermal) or LC50  (inhalation).
 Skin corrosion means the production of irreversible damage to the skin following the application of a test substance for up to 4 hours. Substances and mixtures in this hazard class are assigned to a single harmonized corrosion category.
 Skin irritation means the production of reversible damage to the skin following the application of a test substance for up to 4 hours. Substances and mixtures in this hazard class are assigned to a single irritant category. For those authorities, such as pesticide regulators, wanting more than one designation for skin irritation, an additional mild irritant category is provided.
 Serious eye damage means the production of tissue damage in the eye, or serious physical decay of vision, following application of a test substance to the front surface of the eye, which is not fully reversible within 21 days of application. Substances and mixtures in this hazard class are assigned to a single harmonized category.
 Eye irritation means changes in the eye following the application of a test substance to the front surface of the eye, which are fully reversible within 21 days of application. Substances and mixtures in this hazard class are assigned to a single harmonized hazard category.  For authorities, such as pesticide regulators, wanting more than one designation for eye irritation, one of two subcategories can be selected, depending on whether the effects are reversible in 21 or 7 days.
 Respiratory sensitizer means a substance that induces hypersensitivity of the airways following inhalation of the substance. Substances and mixtures in this hazard class are assigned to one hazard category.
 Skin sensitizer means a substance that will induce an allergic response following skin contact. The definition for "skin sensitizer" is equivalent to "contact sensitizer". Substances and mixtures in this hazard class are assigned to one hazard category.
 Germ cell mutagenicity means an agent giving rise to an increased occurrence of mutations in populations of cells and/or organisms. Substances and mixtures in this hazard class are assigned to one of two hazard categories. Category 1 has two subcategories.
 Carcinogenicity means a chemical substance or a mixture of chemical substances that induce cancer or increase its incidence. Substances and mixtures in this hazard class are assigned to one of two hazard categories. Category 1 has two subcategories.
 Reproductive toxicity includes adverse effects on sexual function and fertility in adult males and females, as well as developmental toxicity in offspring.  Substances and mixtures with reproductive and/or developmental effects are assigned to one of two hazard categories, 'known or presumed' and 'suspected'. Category 1 has two subcategories for reproductive and developmental effects. Materials which cause concern for the health of breastfed children have a separate category: effects on or via Lactation.
 Specific target organ toxicity (STOT)  category distinguishes between single and repeated exposure for Target Organ Effects.  All significant health effects, not otherwise specifically included in the GHS, that can impair function, both reversible and irreversible, immediate and/or delayed are included in the non-lethal target organ/systemic toxicity class (TOST). Narcotic effects and respiratory tract irritation are considered to be target organ systemic effects following a single exposure.  Substances and mixtures of the single exposure target organ toxicity hazard class are assigned to one of three hazard categories.  Substances and mixtures of the repeated exposure target organ toxicity hazard class are assigned to one of two hazard categories.
 Aspiration hazard includes severe acute effects such as chemical pneumonia, varying degrees of pulmonary injury or death following aspiration. Aspiration is the entry of a liquid or solid directly through the oral or nasal cavity, or indirectly from vomiting, into the trachea and lower respiratory system.  Substances and mixtures of this hazard class are assigned to one of two hazard categories this hazard class on the basis of viscosity.

Substitute substances
Sometimes companies are able to replace hazardous substances with substances featuring a reduced health risk. As an assistance to assess possible substitute substances, the Institute for Occupational Safety and Health of the German Social Accident Insurance (IFA) has developed the Column Model. On the basis of just a small amount of information on a product, substitute substances can be evaluated with the support of this table. The current version from 2020 already includes the amendments of the 12th CLP Adaptation Regulation 2019/521.

Environmental hazards

 Acute aquatic toxicity means the intrinsic property of a material of causing injury to an aquatic organism in a short-term exposure. Substances and mixtures of this hazard class are assigned to one of three toxicity categories on the basis of acute toxicity data: LC50 (fish) or EC50 (crustacean) or ErC50 (for algae or other aquatic plants). In some regulatory systems these acute toxicity categories may be subdivided or extended for certain sectors.
 Chronic aquatic toxicity means the potential or actual properties of a material to cause adverse effects to aquatic organisms during exposures that are determined in relation to the lifecycle of the organism. Substances and mixtures in this hazard class are assigned to one of four toxicity categories on the basis of acute data and environmental fate data:  LC50 (fish) or EC50 (crustacea) or ErC50 (for algae or other aquatic plants) and degradation or bioaccumulation.

Classification of mixtures

The GHS approach to the classification of mixtures for health and environmental hazards is also complex.  It uses a tiered approach and is dependent upon the amount of information available for the mixture itself and for its components. Principles that have been developed for the classification of mixtures, drawing on existing systems such as the European Union (EU) system for classification of preparations laid down in Directive 1999/45/EC.  The process for the classification of mixtures is based on the following steps:

 Where toxicological or ecotoxicological test data are available for the mixture itself, the classification of the mixture will be based on that data;
 Where test data are not available for the mixture itself, then the appropriate bridging principles should be applied, which uses test data for components and/or similar mixtures;
 If (1) test data are not available for the mixture itself, and (2) the bridging principles cannot be applied, then use the calculation or cutoff values described in the specific endpoint to classify the mixture.

Testing requirements

The GHS document does not include testing requirements for substances or mixtures.  In fact, one of the main goals of the GHS is to reduce the need for animal testing.  The GHS criteria for determining health and environmental hazards are test method neutral, allowing different approaches as long as they are scientifically sound and validated according to international procedures and criteria already referred to in existing systems.  Test data already generated for the classification of chemicals under existing systems should be accepted when classifying these chemicals under the GHS, thereby avoiding duplicative testing and the unnecessary use of test animals.  The GHS physical hazard criteria are linked to specific UN test methods.  It is assumed that mixtures will be tested for physical hazards.

Hazard communication

Per GHS, hazards need to be communicated:
 in more than one form (for example, placards, labels or SDS's).
 with hazard statements and precautionary statements.
 in an easily comprehensible and standardized manner.
 consistent with other statements to reduce confusion.
 taking into account all existing research and any new evidence.

Comprehensibility is challenging for a single culture and language, so global harmonization is complex. The GHS Purple Book includes a comprehensibility-testing instrument in Annex 6. Factors that were considered in developing the GHS communication tools include:
 Different philosophies in existing systems on how and what should be communicated;
 Language differences around the world;
 Ability to translate phrases meaningfully;
 Ability to understand and appropriately respond to pictograms.

GHS label elements 

The standardized label elements included in the GHS are:
 Symbols (GHS hazard pictograms): Convey health, physical and environmental hazard information, assigned to a GHS hazard class and category.  Pictograms include the harmonized hazard symbols plus other graphic elements, such as borders, background patterns or cozers and substances which have target organ toxicity. Also, harmful chemicals and irritants are marked with an exclamation mark, replacing the European saltire. Pictograms will have a black symbol on a white background with a red diamond frame.  For transport, pictograms will have the background, symbol and colors currently used in the UN Recommendations on the Transport of Dangerous Goods. Where a transport pictogram appears, the GHS pictogram for the same hazard should not appear.
 Signal word:  "Danger" or "Warning" will be used to emphasize hazards and indicate the relative level of severity of the hazard, assigned to a GHS hazard class and category.  Some lower level hazard categories do not use signal words. Only one signal word corresponding to the class of the most severe hazard should be used on a label.
 GHS hazard statements: Standard phrases assigned to a hazard class and category that describe the nature of the hazard.  An appropriate statement for each GHS hazard should be included on the label for products possessing more than one hazard.

The additional label elements included in the GHS are:
 GHS precautionary statements: Measures to minimize or prevent adverse effects.  There are four types of precautionary statements covering: prevention, response in cases of accidental spillage or exposure, storage, and disposal. The precautionary statements have been linked to each GHS hazard statement and type of hazard.
 Product identifier (ingredient disclosure): Name or number used for a hazardous product on a label or in the SDS.  The GHS label for a substance should include the chemical identity of the substance.  For mixtures, the label should include the chemical identities of all ingredients that contribute to acute toxicity, skin corrosion or serious eye damage, germ cell mutagenicity, carcinogenicity, reproductive toxicity, skin or respiratory sensitization, or Specific Target Organ Toxicity (STOT), when these hazards appear on the label.
 Supplier identification: The name, address and telephone number should be provided on the label.
 Supplemental information: Non-harmonized information on the container of a hazardous product that is not required or specified under the GHS.  Supplemental information may be used to provide further detail that does not contradict or cast doubt on the validity of the standardized hazard information.

GHS label format

The GHS includes directions for application of the hazard communication elements on the label. In particular, it specifies for each hazard, and for each class within the hazard, what signal word, pictogram, and hazard statement should be used. The GHS hazard pictograms, signal words and hazard statements should be located together on the label. The actual label format or layout is not specified in the GHS. National authorities may choose to specify where information should appear on the label or allow supplier discretion.  There has been discussion about the size of GHS pictograms and that a GHS pictogram might be confused with a transport pictogram or "diamond". Transport pictograms are different in appearance than the GHS pictograms. Annex 7 of the Purple Book explains how the GHS pictograms are expected to be proportional to the size of the label text so that generally the GHS pictograms would be smaller than the transport pictograms.

Safety data sheet

The safety data sheet or SDS (the GHS dropped the word "material" from "material safety data sheet" in its final revisions) is specifically aimed at use in the workplace. It should provide comprehensive information about the chemical product that allows employers and workers to obtain concise, relevant and accurate information in perspective to the hazards, uses and risk management of the chemical product in the workplace. While there were some differences in existing industry recommendations and country specific requirements, there was agreement on a 16-section SDS to include the following headings in the order specified:

 Identification
 Hazard(s) identification
 Composition/ information on ingredients
 First-aid measures
 Fire-fighting measures
 Accidental release measures
 Handling and storage
 Exposure control/ personal protection
 Physical and chemical properties
 Chemical stability and reactivity
 Toxicological information
 Ecological information
 Disposal considerations
 Transport information
 Regulatory information
 Other information

The primary difference between the GHS and the international industry recommendations is that sections 2 and 3 have been reversed in order.  The GHS SDS headings, sequence and content are similar to the ISO, European Union and ANSI MSDS/SDS requirements.  The SDS should provide a clear description of the data used to identify the hazards.  A table comparing the content and format of a MSDS/SDS versus the GHS SDS is provided in Appendix A of the U.S. Occupational Safety and Health Administration (OSHA) GHS guidance.

Training

Current training procedures for Hazard Communication in the United States are more detailed than the GHS training recommendations. Educating employees on the updated chemical and product classifications and related pictograms, signal words, hazard statements and precautionary measures at the level of detail by the national authority represents the greatest training challenge.  Training will be a key component of the overall GHS approach and should incorporate information as it is introduced into the workplace.  Employees and emergency responders will need to be trained on all new program elements, from hazard statements to pictograms. Bear in mind, if the importation of products using only GHS labeling is permitted prior to its adoption in the United States and Canada, employers may need to begin employee training earlier than expected.

Implementation

The United Nations goal was broad international adoption, and as of 2017, GHS has been adopted to varying degrees in nearly all major countries. 

GHS adoption by country:
 
Australia: In 2012, adopted regulation for GHS implementation, setting January 1, 2017 as the GHS implementation deadline.
Brazil: Established an implementation deadline of February 2011 for substances and June 2015 for mixtures.
Canada: GHS has been incorporated into WHMIS 2015 as of February 2015.
China: Established implementation deadline of December 1, 2011.
Colombia: By June, 2014 No deadline had been set up yet. the subcommittee for the implementation within the Mesa de Seguridad Química (Bureau of Chemical Safety), began communication between the government, the private sector and civil society.
European Union: The deadline for substance classification was December 1, 2010 and for mixtures it was June 1, 2015 per regulation for GHS implementation on December 31, 2008.
United Kingdom: Implemented under EU directive by REACH regulations, this may be subject to change due to Brexit. 
Japan: Established deadline of December 31, 2010 for products containing one of 640 designated substances.
South Korea: Established the GHS implementation deadline of July 1, 2013.
Malaysia: Deadline for substance and mixture was April 17, 2015 per its Industry Code of Practice on Chemicals Classification and Hazard Communication(ICOP) on 16 April 2014.
Mexico: GHS has been incorporated into the Official Mexican Standard as of 2015.
Pakistan: Country does not a single streamlined system for chemical labeling, although there are many rules in place. The Pakistani government has requested assistance in developing future regulations to implement GHS.
Philippines: The deadline for substance and mixture was March 14, 2015 per Guidelines for the Implementation of GHS in Chemical Safety Program in the Workplace in 2014.
Russian Federation. GHS was approved for optional use as of August 2014. Manufacturers may continue using non-GHS Russian labels through 2021, after which compliance with the system is compulsory.
Taiwan: Full GHS implementation was scheduled for 2016 for all hazardous chemicals with physical and health hazards.
Thailand: The deadline for substances was March 13, 2013. The deadline for mixture was March 13, 2017.
Turkey: Published Turkish CLP regulation and SDS regulation in 2013 and 2014 respectively. The deadline for substance classification was June 1, 2015, for mixtures, it was June 1, 2016.
United States: GHS compliant labels and SDSs are required for many applications including laboratory chemicals, commercial cleaning agents, and other workplace cases regulated by previous US Occupational Health and Safety Administration (OSHA) standards. First widespread implementation set by OSHA was on March 26, 2012, requiring manufacturers to adopt the standard by June 1, 2015 and product distributors to adopt the standard by December 1, 2015. Workers had to be trained by December 1, 2013. In the US, GHS labels are not required on most hazardous consumer grade products (ex. laundry detergent) however some manufacturers which also sell the same product in Canada or Europe include GHS compliant warnings on these products too. The US Consumer Product Safety Commission is not opposed to this and has been evaluating the possibility of incorporating elements of GHS into future consumer regulations.
Uruguay: regulation approved in 2011, setting December 31, 2012 as deadline for pure substances and December 31, 2017 for compounds.
Vietnam: The deadline for substances was March 30, 2014. The deadline for mixtures was March 30, 2016.

See also
ISO 7010
Toxicity category rating
UN number

References

Bibliography

External links

 About the GHS
 Globally Harmonized System of Classification and Labelling of Chemicals (GHS) - Ninth revised edition

Chemical safety
Chemical classification
 
Hazard analysis
International standards